Shannon Watts (born January 1, 1971) is an American gun violence prevention activist and the founder of Moms Demand Action, the nation’s largest grassroots group fighting against gun violence. Watts has campaigned for a number of gun control candidates across the country, including President Joe Biden. In 2016, Watts became a board member of Emerge America, an organizations for recruiting and training women to run for office. Watts also serves on the board of Advance Peace, which is dedicated to ending cyclical and retaliatory gun violence in American urban neighborhoods.

Early life and education

Watts was born in Rochester, New York, and graduated from the University of Missouri in 1994. After college, she worked in the Missouri House of Representatives and for former Governor Mel Carnahan. 
Watts then built a career as a communications executive, including FleishmanHillard, Monsanto, GE Healthcare and WellPoint. In 2008, she left the corporate career to focus on her family.

Moms Demand Action

On December 14, 2012, a gunman had opened fire in Sandy Hook School in Newtown, Connecticut, killing 26 children and educators. The next day, Watts started a Facebook group to unite women against the gun lobby in the way Mothers Against Drunk Driving had united mothers against the alcohol lobby in the 1980s. The Facebook page grew into a grassroots movement after volunteers contacted Watts about forming Moms Demand Action chapters in their own communities. 
Moms Demand Action now has chapters in every state and over 6 million supporters nationwide. For over eight years, Moms Demand Action volunteers have stopped the NRA’s priority legislation in statehouses more than 90 percent of the time, and helped pass hundreds of gun safety laws across the country, changed corporate policies, and educated Americans about secure gun storage. In the 2022 election, 140 Moms Demand Action volunteers were elected to public office.

Volunteers wear red t-shirts emblazoned with the Moms Demand Action logo to show their support and stand out at legislative hearings, protests and other events. In 2013, Moms Demand Action and Mayors Against Illegal Guns joined forces to become Everytown for Gun Safety. In March 2020, Watts campaigned with presidential candidate Joe Biden in Ohio. Watts has given speeches at places such as Valparaiso University and Mountain Calvary Lutheran Church. Watts announced that she will be stepping back from her leadership role at Moms Demand Action at the end of 2023.

United Airlines
In 2017, Watts spoke out against United Airlines on Twitter after witnessing an agent deny boarding to two teenage girls wearing leggings in Denver International Airport. Watts added that the girls' father was allowed to board without incident, despite wearing shorts. United later stated that the two teenagers were pass riders under the airline's company travel perk program who were subject to a stricter dress code, whereas leggings or yoga pants are acceptable for regular passengers.

Writing

Watts is the author of the 2019 book Fight Like a Mother: How a Grassroots Movement Took on the Gun Lobby and Why Women Will Change the World. The book’s foreword was written by actress Julianne Moore, who is also the founding chair of the Everytown Creative Council. Watts also blogs on Medium about her work and the victories achieved by Moms Demand Action volunteers.

Ahead of the 2020 election, Watts hosted a virtual series called Demanding Women: Quarantine Conversations About Gun Violence. As part of the series, Watts spoke with Stacey Abrams, Elizabeth Warren, Amy Klobuchar, Vice President Kamala Harris, New Mexico Governor Michelle Lujan Grisham, Rep. Val Demmings, former National Security Advisor Susan Rice, Rep. Karen Bass, Atlanta Mayor Keisha Lance Bottoms, Tammy Duckworth, Tammy Baldwin and Michigan Governor Gretchen Whitmer.

Watts is also active on Twitter, where she has more than 500,000 followers. She has also appeared as a commentator on MSNBC, CNN, CBS and NPR and written opinion pieces for Elle, Refinery29, Time.com, Newsweek and Marie Claire, among others.

Personal life

Since starting Moms Demand Action, Watts has lived in Indiana, Colorado and California. She and her husband now live in the Bay Area. She is the mother of five children. In her book, Watts wrote that she was enrolled in a yoga teacher training course when she founded Moms Demand Action. She is a Buddhist who practices yoga regularly and meditates at least once a day.

Awards and recognition

 2008: PRWeek’s 40 Under 40
 2014: People Magazine's 15 Women Changing the World Right Now
 2018: Bloomberg Philanthropies, award in recognition for work to reduce gun violence
 2018: Instyle, Badass Woman
 2018: People Magazine, 25 Women Changing the World
 2018: YBCA 100 Honoree, Yerba Buena Center for the Arts, San Francisco
 2019: University of Missouri Griffiths Leadership Society “Spirit of Martha” Award
 2020: Peacemaker of the Year Award from the Houston Peace and Justice Center
 2020: Teacher’s College, Columbia University, Medal for Distinguished Service
 2021: Washington University in St. Louis, Honorary Doctorate of Humanities
 2022: Glamour Women of the Year
 2022: TheWrap Power Women Summit Changemakers of the Year

References

External links
 Moms Demand Action official website
  for The Opposition with Jordan Klepper 

Living people
1971 births
Activists from Rochester, New York
University of Missouri alumni
American gun control activists
American women company founders
Women founders